Divan Hugh Uys (born ) is a South African rugby union referee on the National Panel of the South African Rugby Union.

He made his debut in the Currie Cup competition in August 2019, taking charge of the  versus  match in Pretoria.

References

Living people
South African rugby union referees
SARU referees
Currie Cup referees
1986 births